Anarchias leucurus is a moray eel found in the Pacific Ocean. It was first named by Snyder in 1904 as Uropterygius leucurus, and is commonly known as Snyder's moray, the fine-spotted moray or the finespot moray. It is thought to be the smallest species of moray, and may actually represent several different species or subspecies.

References

leucurus
Fish described in 1904
Fish of the Pacific Ocean
Taxa named by John Otterbein Snyder